KKYX (680 AM) is a classic country music radio station owned by Cox Media Group. It is licensed to, and headquartered in San Antonio, Texas. The station also carries play-by-play of the San Antonio Missions of the Texas League (Minor League Baseball). Its studios are located in Northwest San Antonio near the South Texas Medical Center complex, and the transmitter site is in east Medina County, west of the city proper.
KKYX morning personality Jerry King is also a member of the Country DJ Hall Of Fame. Jerry retired from KKYX in 2018 after a 53-year radio career. Of those 53 years, he worked for KKYX for 43 years.

History
KKYX signed on, with the sequentially issued call letters KGCM, in the fall of 1926. It initially had limited programming, and in early December the schedule of the then-ten watt station was reported to be "Daily except Sunday: 10:15 a.m weather forecast; 10:30-11:30 a.m. request music; 12:30 road information followed by music; 6:30-7:30 p.m. request music".

During this time the local Chamber of Commerce was promoting San Antonio as "America's Playground" for conventions and tourists. Aligning the station with this promotion, in December 1926 station owner Robert Bridge arranged for the call letters to be changed to KTAP, standing for the slogan "Kum to America's Playground". The station's later call signs were KABC, KGBS and KENS, followed in 1962 by KBAT. The current KKYX call sign was adopted on September 4, 1972, and the station has had a country music format ever since. It became a major outlet for country music that serves much of south Texas. During the 1970s and early 1980s, KKYX was ranked one of the top ten country music radio stations in the United States.

It currently broadcasts a classic country music format, similar to that of WSM AM 650 in Nashville, Tennessee, focusing on old country hits over the years from the 1950s to the 1990s.

Coverage area
KKYX has a fairly large coverage area, covering a large area of southern Texas, including the entire San Antonio and Austin radio markets, along with areas around Victoria, Texas. Grade B coverage can be received in the Corpus Christi and Houston areas. About 100 counties were claimed to be part of the KKYX listening area.

Translator

References

External links

Classic country radio stations in the United States
KYX
American Basketball Association flagship radio stations
Cox Media Group
Radio stations established in 1926
1926 establishments in Texas